Santpedor is a municipality and town in the comarca of Bages, central Catalonia. It is located north of Manresa, the flattest sector of Bages. Sights include the Romanesque-Gothic church of St. Peter, and the Hermitage of St. Francis.

Notable natives of Santpedor include Sandra Sangiao, the voice of the Barcelona Gipsy Klezmer Orchestra (BGKO) and Pep Guardiola, former Barcelona football player and current manager of Manchester City.

References

External links

 Government data pages 

Municipalities in Bages